The 2001–02 season of Segunda División B of Spanish football started August 2001 and ended May 2002.

Summary before the 2001–02 season 
Playoffs de Ascenso:

 Atlético Madrid B 
 Ourense
 Zamora
 Toledo
 Burgos (P) 
 Cultural Leonesa 
 Calahorra
 Amurrio
 Gramenet
 Gimnàstic de Tarragona (P) 
 Sabadell 
 Espanyol B
 Cádiz 
 Ejido (P)  
 Xerez  (P) 
 Ceuta

Relegated from Segunda División:

 Compostela
 Universidad de Las Palmas
 Getafe
 Lleida

Promoted from Tercera División:

 Celta de Vigo B (from Group 1)
 Marino de Luanco (from Group 2)
 Oviedo B (from Group 2)
 Real Sociedad B (from Group 4)
 Alicante (from Group 6)
 Valencia B (from Group 6)
 Onda (from Group 6)
 RSD Alcalá (from Group 7)
 Sevilla B (from Group 10)
 Betis B (from Group 10)
 Lanzarote (from Group 12)
 Ciudad de Murcia (from Group 13)
 Díter Zafra (from Group 14)
 UD Mérida Promesas (from Group 14)
 Logroñés (from Group 15)
 Alfaro (from Group 15)
 Huesca (from Group 16)

Relegated:

 Siero
 San Sebastián de los Reyes
 Ávila
 Deportivo La Coruña B
 Racing de Santander B
 Peña Sport
 Tropezón
 Chantrea
 Burriana
 Alzira
 Gandía
 Premià
 Guadix
 Linares
 Don Benito
 Polideportivo Almería
 Fuenlabrada

Group I
Teams from Álava (Basque Country), Asturias, Biscay (Basque Country), Cantabria, Castile and León and Galicia.

Teams

League table

Results

Top goalscorers

Group II
Teams from Aragon, Gipuzkoa (Basque Country), Catalonia, La Rioja and Navarre.

Teams

League Table

Results

Top goalscorers

Group III
Teams from Canary Islands, Castilla–La Mancha, Community of Madrid and Valencian Community

Teams

League Table

Results

Top goalscorers

Group IV
Teams from Andalusia, Balearic Islands, Ceuta, Extremadura, Melilla and Region of Murcia.

Teams

League Table

Results

Top goalscorers

Play-out

Semifinal

Final

External links
Futbolme.com

 
Segunda División B seasons

3
Spain